Rose Director Friedman (born Rose Director (December 1910 – 18 August 2009), was a free-market economist and co-founder of the Milton and Rose D. Friedman Foundation.

Biography
Rose Director was born in Staryi Chortoryisk, in Ukraine, to the Director family, prominent Jewish residents. She is believed to have been born the last week of December, 1910; however, the birth records have been lost. In her youth, she wrote articles with Dorothy Brady on consumption. Rose Friedman attended Reed College and then transferred to the University of Chicago, where she received a Bachelor of Philosophy degree. After this she began to study for a doctorate in economics at the University of Chicago and completed all work necessary for the Ph.D. except for writing the dissertation. 

She was married to her frequent collaborator, Milton Friedman (1912–2006), who won the 1976 Nobel Prize in Economics. Her brother, Aaron Director (1901–2004), was a professor at the University of Chicago Law School and one of the founders of the economic analysis of law.

With Milton, she co-wrote two books on economics and public policy, Free to Choose and Tyranny of the Status Quo, and their memoirs Two Lucky People, which appeared in 1998. Together they founded EdChoice (formerly the Milton and Rose D. Friedman Foundation), with the aim of promoting the use of school vouchers and freedom of choice in education. She also co-produced the PBS television series, Free to Choose, and assisted her husband in writing his 1962 political philosophy book Capitalism and Freedom.

She received an honorary LL.D. in December 1986 from Pepperdine University.

When Milton received his Medal of Freedom in 1988, President Ronald Reagan said jokingly in his speech that Rose was known for being the only person to ever have won an argument against Milton. The Friedmans had two children, Janet and David.

References

External links
 The Friedman Foundation
 In Memoriam: Rose Friedman by Guy Sorman
 

1910 births
2009 deaths
People from Volyn Oblast
People from Lutsky Uyezd
Ukrainian Jews
Emigrants from the Russian Empire to the United States
American people of Ukrainian-Jewish descent
Friedman family
20th-century American economists
American libertarians
20th-century American memoirists
American political writers
Jewish American social scientists
Jewish American writers
Libertarian economists
American women economists
Reed College alumni
University of Chicago alumni
Member of the Mont Pelerin Society